Bolívar Modualdo Guedes (born 21 December 1954), known as Bolívar, is a Brazilian former footballer who played as a midfielder. He competed in the men's tournament at the 1972 Summer Olympics.

References

External links
 

Living people
1954 births
Footballers from Porto Alegre
Brazilian footballers
Association football midfielders
Brazil international footballers
Olympic footballers of Brazil
Footballers at the 1972 Summer Olympics